Charles Johann Palmié (1863-1911) is a pointillist/Neo-Impressionist painter noted for being a founding member with Wassily Kandinsky in 1909 of NKVM which prefigured Der Blaue Reiter, the first modernist secession which is regarded as a forerunner and pathfinder for Modern art in 20th-century Germany and for painting with Claude Monet in Giverny, France in 1906.

Biography 

Charles Johann Palmié was born on October 22, 1863 in Aschersleben, Germany.   He was first trained from the age of 14 as a decorative painter under the court theater decoration painter Rieck in Dresden.  Palmie then spent two years at the Dresden Academy of Fine Arts.
 
At age 20 in 1883 he received his first large commission work from today's Leonhardi Museum in Dresden, then owned by the painter Eduard Leonhardi, to do a rich colorful painting renovation in the romanticed style of the 19th century .

In 1884 Palmié moves from Dresden to Munich, where he completes his artistic education as a student of August Fink.

In 1886 he marries the flower painter Marie Kapferer as he is now able to derive his fully time income from being an independent artist having built his reputation by being represented with work at an important exhibition in the new Munich Glass Palace (Glaspalast, Munich).

Palmie travelled to paint, first he made regular trips to the Alps, then since the 1890s also made regular painting trips to the plains of the Altmühltal, the Wörnitz and the Danube, which inspired the artist to mostly large-scale paintings in the neo-impressionist style .  Later he would travel to France.

1901 Palmie opens an Inn, run by his wife, to cater to painters in Kallmunz Germany.  Palmié called Kallmünz, on the Naab River, the "pearl of the Naabtal".  Soon the artist colony numbers 38 painters with many settling permanently. Kallmünz became best known through Wassily Kandinsky's and Gabriele Münter's stay in the summer of 1903.

Falling under the influence of Claude Monet in 1891 Palmie spent the summer of 1906 painting in Giverny France where he heightened his ability to capture shimmering light and atmosphere, taking a further step toward abstraction in art.

In 1909 Palmié, together with Wassily Kandinsky, Alexei Jawlensky, Gabriele Münter and others, becomes one of the founding members of the Neue Künstlervereinigung München, (Wassily Kandinsky was the Chairman which later became Der Blaue Reiter).   Palmie resigns before the first NKVM exhibition in the winter of 1909 because of artistic differences.
 
Two years later, Charles Palmié dies of a sudden stroke on July 15, 1911 in Munich.

References

1863 births
1911 deaths
German Impressionist painters
20th-century German painters
20th-century German male artists
19th-century German painters
19th-century German male artists